Kuyunba Conservation Reserve is a protected area in the Northern Territory of  Australia.

The threatened species, the Black-footed rock wallaby, is known to inhabit the area.

The conservation reserve is categorised as an IUCN Category V protected area.

See also
Protected areas of the Northern Territory

References

External links
Webpage on the Protected Planet website

Conservation reserves in the Northern Territory
Protected areas established in 1970
1970 establishments in Australia